This is a list of the albums released in relation to the visual novel Shuffle! and its adaptations.

Shuffle! visual novel

Original Soundtrack

Catalog number LACA-9035.

Disc 1

Disc 2

Perfect Arrange Album

Catalog number BJCA-0002.

8 cm bonus CD

Drama Series

FILE.01: Lisianthus

Catalog number LACA-5282.

FILE.02: Nerine

Catalog number LACA-5291.

FILE.03: Fuyou Kaede

Catalog number LACA-5296.

FILE.04: Shigure Asa

Catalog number LACA-5308.

FILE.05: Primula

Catalog number LACA-5314.

Shuffle! Time Character Vocal Image Album

Catalog number LACA-5325.

Rainbow Remix

Catalog number LACA-5399.

Shuffle! On the Stage visual novel

ORIGINAL!

A Maxi single for the opening theme to the Shuffle! On the Stage visual novel. Catalog number LACM-4232.

Re-Mix Album COMPOSITION ELEVEN

Catalog number LACA-5456.

Character Vocal Album

Catalog number LACA-5497.

Drama vol.1: Mayumi Thyme

Catalog number LACA-5485.

Drama vol.2: Kareha

Catalog number LACA-5519.

Shuffle! Essence+ visual novel

Link-age

A Maxi single for the opening theme to the Shuffle! Essence+ visual novel. Catalog number LACM-4682.

Shuffle! anime

YOU

A Maxi single for the opening theme to the Shuffle! anime. Catalog number LACM-4207.

innocence

A Maxi single for the ending theme to the Shuffle! anime. Catalog number LACM-4213.

Character Vocal and Soundtrack CDs

#1: Lisianthus

Comes packaged with the limited edition versions of the first Shuffle! anime DVD.

#2: Nerine

Comes packaged with the limited edition versions of the second Shuffle! anime DVD.

#3: Kaede

Comes packaged with the limited edition versions of the third Shuffle! anime DVD.

#4: Asa

Comes packaged with the limited edition versions of the fourth Shuffle! anime DVD.

#5: Primula

Comes packaged with the limited edition versions of the fifth Shuffle! anime DVD.

#6: Mayumi Thyme

Comes packaged with the limited edition versions of the sixth Shuffle! anime DVD.

#7: Kareha

Comes packaged with the limited edition versions of the seventh Shuffle! anime DVD.

#8: Ama

Comes packaged with the limited edition versions of the eighth Shuffle! anime DVD.

#9: Lycoris

Comes packaged with the limited edition versions of the ninth Shuffle! anime DVD.

#10: Kikyou

Comes packaged with the limited edition versions of the tenth Shuffle! anime DVD.

#11: Lisianthus & Nerine

Comes packaged with the limited edition versions of the eleventh Shuffle! anime DVD.

#12: Kaede & Asa

Comes packaged with the limited edition versions of the twelfth Shuffle! anime DVD.

Shuffle! Memories anime

Original Soundtrack

Catalog number LACA-5642.

Character Song Album

Catalog number LACA-5624.

Original Drama CD 1: Kaede Fuyou

Catalog number LACA-5632.

Original Drama CD 2: Lisianthus

Catalog number LACA-5701.

Original Drama CD 3: Nerine

Catalog number LACA-5735.

Shuffle! Charadio drama series
 is a 2005-2006 radio drama series hosted by Sayaka Aoki, as Lisianthus, and Haruka Nagami, as Nerine. While the word blends smoothly in Japanese because of the single pronunciation of the 'a' sound, it gets mangled in English.

Charadio vol. 1

Catalog number LACA-5437.

Charadio vol. 2

Catalog number LACA-5443.

Charadio vol. 3

Catalog number LACA-5447.

Charadio vol. 4

Catalog number LACA-5459.

Charadio vol. 5

Catalog number LACA-5479.

Charadio Petit! vol. 1

Catalog number LACA-5502.

Charadio Petit! vol. 2

Catalog number LACA-5525.

References

 Official list of Shuffle! albums on the Lantis label.
 List of Shuffle! CDs on Navel website.
 Shuffle! CDs on official SHUFFLE! MEMORIES website.

Anime soundtracks
Lantis (company) albums
Albums
Video game soundtracks
Film and television discographies
Discographies of Japanese artists
Video game music discographies
Lantis (company) soundtracks
Lantis (company) remix albums